Eton School is a private preschool through high school in Mexico City. There is a toddler center and a preschool in Lomas de Chapultepec, Miguel Hidalgo, while the campus for elementary through high school is in Santa Fe and in Cuajimalpa. As of 2016 the school has about 1,400 students.

Margarita Arzac, a Mexican woman, founded the school in 1990.

References

External links
 Eton School

High schools in Mexico City
Private schools in Mexico
Cuajimalpa
Miguel Hidalgo, Mexico City
1990 establishments in Mexico
Educational institutions established in 1990
Nord Anglia Education